Frontwave Arena is a multi-purpose 7,600 seat indoor arena under construction in Oceanside, California. The arena, projected to open in the first quarter of 2024, will be the new home of the Major Arena Soccer League (MASL)'s San Diego Sockers. The arena will also be the first large multi purpose indoor entertainment venue in North County (San Diego area). The arena was known as CaliFino Arena during its planning stages, in honor of Sockers owner Phil Salvagio's company, CaliFino Tequila. In July 2022, a 9-year naming rights agreement with Oceanside-headquartered Frontwave Credit Union was announced, giving the arena its official name.

References

External links 

 Official Site

Indoor arenas under construction in the United States